Dmitriyevka is the name of several inhabited localities in Russia.

Altai Krai
As of 2010, one rural locality in Altai Krai bears this name:
Dmitriyevka, Altai Krai, a selo in Lenkovsky Selsoviet of Blagoveshchensky District

Altai Republic
As of 2010, one rural locality in the Altai Republic bears this name:
Dmitriyevka, Altai Republic, a selo in Dmitriyevskoye Rural Settlement of Turochaksky District

Amur Oblast
As of 2010, three rural localities in Amur Oblast bear this name:
Dmitriyevka, Ivanovsky District, Amur Oblast, a selo in Dmitriyevsky Rural Settlement of Ivanovsky District
Dmitriyevka, Mazanovsky District, Amur Oblast, a selo in Dmitriyevsky Rural Settlement of Mazanovsky District
Dmitriyevka, Svobodnensky District, Amur Oblast, a selo in Dmitriyevsky Rural Settlement of Svobodnensky District

Astrakhan Oblast
As of 2010, one rural locality in Astrakhan Oblast bears this name:
Dmitriyevka, Astrakhan Oblast, a selo in Pokrovsky Selsoviet of Akhtubinsky District

Republic of Bashkortostan
As of 2010, thirteen rural localities in the Republic of Bashkortostan bear this name:
Dmitriyevka, Blagovarsky District, Republic of Bashkortostan, a village in Dmitriyevsky Selsoviet of Blagovarsky District
Dmitriyevka, Nikolayevsky Selsoviet, Blagoveshchensky District, Republic of Bashkortostan, a village in Nikolayevsky Selsoviet of Blagoveshchensky District
Dmitriyevka, Pokrovsky Selsoviet, Blagoveshchensky District, Republic of Bashkortostan, a village in Pokrovsky Selsoviet of Blagoveshchensky District
Dmitriyevka, Dmitriyevsky Selsoviet, Chishminsky District, Republic of Bashkortostan, a village in Dmitriyevsky Selsoviet of Chishminsky District
Dmitriyevka, Shingak-Kulsky Selsoviet, Chishminsky District, Republic of Bashkortostan, a village in Shingak-Kulsky Selsoviet of Chishminsky District
Dmitriyevka, Beloozersky Selsoviet, Gafuriysky District, Republic of Bashkortostan, a village in Beloozersky Selsoviet of Gafuriysky District
Dmitriyevka, Mrakovsky Selsoviet, Gafuriysky District, Republic of Bashkortostan, a village in Mrakovsky Selsoviet of Gafuriysky District
Dmitriyevka, Karmaskalinsky District, Republic of Bashkortostan, a village in Yefremkinsky Selsoviet of Karmaskalinsky District
Dmitriyevka, Nordovsky Selsoviet, Meleuzovsky District, Republic of Bashkortostan, a village in Nordovsky Selsoviet of Meleuzovsky District
Dmitriyevka, Pervomaysky Selsoviet, Meleuzovsky District, Republic of Bashkortostan, a village in Pervomaysky Selsoviet of Meleuzovsky District
Dmitriyevka, Sterlibashevsky District, Republic of Bashkortostan, a village in Starokalkashevsky Selsoviet of Sterlibashevsky District
Dmitriyevka, Ufimsky District, Republic of Bashkortostan, a selo in Dmitriyevsky Selsoviet of Ufimsky District
Dmitriyevka, Zilairsky District, Republic of Bashkortostan, a village in Dmitriyevsky Selsoviet of Zilairsky District

Belgorod Oblast
As of 2010, four rural localities in Belgorod Oblast bear this name:
Dmitriyevka, Rakityansky District, Belgorod Oblast, a selo in Dmitriyevsky Rural Okrug of Rakityansky District
Dmitriyevka, Shebekinsky District, Belgorod Oblast, a selo in Shebekinsky District
Dmitriyevka, Starooskolsky District, Belgorod Oblast, a selo in Starooskolsky District
Dmitriyevka, Yakovlevsky District, Belgorod Oblast, a selo in Yakovlevsky District

Bryansk Oblast
As of 2010, one rural locality in Bryansk Oblast bears this name:
Dmitriyevka, Bryansk Oblast, a village in Staropolonsky Selsoviet of Gordeyevsky District

Chuvash Republic
As of 2010, one rural locality in the Chuvash Republic bears this name:
Dmitriyevka, Chuvash Republic, a village in Shibylginskoye Rural Settlement of Kanashsky District

Irkutsk Oblast
As of 2010, one rural locality in Irkutsk Oblast bears this name:
Dmitriyevka, Irkutsk Oblast, a village in Zalarinsky District

Kaluga Oblast
As of 2010, one rural locality in Kaluga Oblast bears this name:
Dmitriyevka, Kaluga Oblast, a village in Babyninsky District

Kemerovo Oblast
As of 2010, three rural localities in Kemerovo Oblast bear this name:
Dmitriyevka, Chebulinsky District, Kemerovo Oblast, a village in Alchedatskaya Rural Territory of Chebulinsky District
Dmitriyevka, Guryevsky District, Kemerovo Oblast, a selo in Urskaya Rural Territory of Guryevsky District
Dmitriyevka, Kemerovsky District, Kemerovo Oblast, a village in Arsentyevskaya Rural Territory of Kemerovsky District

Republic of Khakassia
As of 2010, one rural locality in the Republic of Khakassia bears this name:
Dmitriyevka, Republic of Khakassia, a village in Novoyeniseysky Selsoviet of Beysky District

Kirov Oblast
As of 2010, one rural locality in Kirov Oblast bears this name:
Dmitriyevka, Kirov Oblast, a village in Meletsky Rural Okrug of Malmyzhsky District

Kostroma Oblast
As of 2010, two rural localities in Kostroma Oblast bear this name:
Dmitriyevka, Buysky District, Kostroma Oblast, a settlement in Baranovskoye Settlement of Buysky District
Dmitriyevka, Nerekhtsky District, Kostroma Oblast, a village in Volzhskoye Settlement of Nerekhtsky District

Krasnoyarsk Krai
As of 2010, two rural localities in Krasnoyarsk Krai bear this name:
Dmitriyevka, Bolshekosulsky Selsoviet, Bogotolsky District, Krasnoyarsk Krai, a village in Bolshekosulsky Selsoviet of Bogotolsky District
Dmitriyevka, Vaginsky Selsoviet, Bogotolsky District, Krasnoyarsk Krai, a village in Vaginsky Selsoviet of Bogotolsky District

Kurgan Oblast
As of 2010, two rural localities in Kurgan Oblast bear this name:
Dmitriyevka, Mokrousovsky District, Kurgan Oblast, a village in Staropershinsky Selsoviet of Mokrousovsky District
Dmitriyevka, Polovinsky District, Kurgan Oblast, a village in Buldaksky Selsoviet of Polovinsky District

Kursk Oblast
As of 2010, five rural localities in Kursk Oblast bear this name:
Dmitriyevka, Fatezhsky District, Kursk Oblast, a village in Verkhnekhotemlsky Selsoviet of Fatezhsky District
Dmitriyevka, Kastorensky District, Kursk Oblast, a khutor in Azarovsky Selsoviet of Kastorensky District
Dmitriyevka, Oktyabrsky District, Kursk Oblast, a village in Starkovsky Selsoviet of Oktyabrsky District
Dmitriyevka, Timsky District, Kursk Oblast, a village in Barkovsky Selsoviet of Timsky District
Dmitriyevka, Zolotukhinsky District, Kursk Oblast, a selo in Dmitriyevsky Selsoviet of Zolotukhinsky District

Lipetsk Oblast
As of 2010, five rural localities in Lipetsk Oblast bear this name:
Dmitriyevka, Krasninsky District, Lipetsk Oblast, a village in Alexandrovsky Selsoviet of Krasninsky District
Dmitriyevka, Stanovlyansky District, Lipetsk Oblast, a selo in Petrishchevsky Selsoviet of Stanovlyansky District
Dmitriyevka, Usmansky District, Lipetsk Oblast, a selo in Dmitriyevsky Selsoviet of Usmansky District
Dmitriyevka, Yeletsky District, Lipetsk Oblast, a village in Nizhnevorgolsky Selsoviet of Yeletsky District
Dmitriyevka, Zadonsky District, Lipetsk Oblast, a village in Verkhnestudenetsky Selsoviet of Zadonsky District

Republic of Mordovia
As of 2010, two rural localities in the Republic of Mordovia bear this name:
Dmitriyevka, Romodanovsky District, Republic of Mordovia, a settlement in Pyatinsky Selsoviet of Romodanovsky District
Dmitriyevka, Zubovo-Polyansky District, Republic of Mordovia, a settlement in Ugolkovsky Selsoviet of Zubovo-Polyansky District

Moscow Oblast
As of 2010, one rural locality in Moscow Oblast bears this name:
Dmitriyevka, Moscow Oblast, a village in Uspenskoye Rural Settlement of Serebryano-Prudsky District

Nizhny Novgorod Oblast
As of 2010, two rural localities in Nizhny Novgorod Oblast bear this name:
Dmitriyevka, Bolsheboldinsky District, Nizhny Novgorod Oblast, a village in Bolsheboldinsky Selsoviet of Bolsheboldinsky District
Dmitriyevka, Knyagininsky District, Nizhny Novgorod Oblast, a village in Solovyevsky Selsoviet of Knyagininsky District

Novosibirsk Oblast
As of 2010, two rural localities in Novosibirsk Oblast bear this name:
Dmitriyevka, Tatarsky District, Novosibirsk Oblast, a selo in Tatarsky District
Dmitriyevka, Ust-Tarksky District, Novosibirsk Oblast, a village in Ust-Tarksky District

Orenburg Oblast
As of 2010, five rural localities in Orenburg Oblast bear this name:
Dmitriyevka, Alexandrovsky District, Orenburg Oblast, a selo in Marksovsky Selsoviet of Alexandrovsky District
Dmitriyevka, Buguruslansky District, Orenburg Oblast, a selo in Dmitriyevsky Selsoviet of Buguruslansky District
Dmitriyevka, Buzuluksky District, Orenburg Oblast, a selo in Novoalexandrovsky Selsoviet of Buzuluksky District
Dmitriyevka, Ponomaryovsky District, Orenburg Oblast, a village in Ponomarevsky Selsoviet of Ponomaryovsky District
Dmitriyevka, Sakmarsky District, Orenburg Oblast, a selo in Verkhnechebenkovsky Selsoviet of Sakmarsky District

Oryol Oblast
As of 2010, four rural localities in Oryol Oblast bear this name:
Dmitriyevka, Mtsensky District, Oryol Oblast, a village in Chakhinsky Selsoviet of Mtsensky District
Dmitriyevka, Galichinsky Selsoviet, Verkhovsky District, Oryol Oblast, a village in Galichinsky Selsoviet of Verkhovsky District
Dmitriyevka, Vasilyevsky Selsoviet, Verkhovsky District, Oryol Oblast, a village in Vasilyevsky Selsoviet of Verkhovsky District
Dmitriyevka, Zalegoshchensky District, Oryol Oblast, a village in Zolotarevsky Selsoviet of Zalegoshchensky District

Penza Oblast
As of 2010, five rural localities in Penza Oblast bear this name:
Dmitriyevka, Issinsky District, Penza Oblast, a selo in Solovtsovsky Selsoviet of Issinsky District
Dmitriyevka, Kameshkirsky District, Penza Oblast, a village in Lapshovsky Selsoviet of Kameshkirsky District
Dmitriyevka, Mokshansky District, Penza Oblast, a selo in Podgornensky Selsoviet of Mokshansky District
Dmitriyevka, Neverkinsky District, Penza Oblast, a selo in Neverkinsky Selsoviet of Neverkinsky District
Dmitriyevka, Pachelmsky District, Penza Oblast, a settlement in Chkalovsky Selsoviet of Pachelmsky District

Primorsky Krai
As of 2010, one rural locality in Primorsky Krai bears this name:
Dmitriyevka, Primorsky Krai, a selo in Chernigovsky District

Ryazan Oblast
As of 2010, eleven rural localities in Ryazan Oblast bear this name:
Dmitriyevka, Mikhaylovsky District, Ryazan Oblast, a village in Gornostayevsky Rural Okrug of Mikhaylovsky District
Dmitriyevka, Alexandro-Nevsky District, Ryazan Oblast, a village in Pavlovsky Rural Okrug of Alexandro-Nevsky District
Dmitriyevka, Ryazansky District, Ryazan Oblast, a village in Lgovsky Rural Okrug of Ryazansky District
Dmitriyevka, Ryazhsky District, Ryazan Oblast, a village in Petrovsky Rural Okrug of Ryazhsky District
Dmitriyevka, Dmitriyevsky Rural Okrug, Sapozhkovsky District, Ryazan Oblast, a village in Dmitriyevsky Rural Okrug of Sapozhkovsky District
Dmitriyevka, Morozovo-Borkovsky Rural Okrug, Sapozhkovsky District, Ryazan Oblast, a village in Morozovo-Borkovsky Rural Okrug of Sapozhkovsky District
Dmitriyevka, Novokrasnensky Rural Okrug, Sapozhkovsky District, Ryazan Oblast, a village in Novokrasnensky Rural Okrug of Sapozhkovsky District
Dmitriyevka, Boretsky Rural Okrug, Sarayevsky District, Ryazan Oblast, a village in Boretsky Rural Okrug of Sarayevsky District
Dmitriyevka, Ozerkovsky Rural Okrug, Sarayevsky District, Ryazan Oblast, a village in Ozerkovsky Rural Okrug of Sarayevsky District
Dmitriyevka, Troitsky Rural Okrug, Sarayevsky District, Ryazan Oblast, a village in Troitsky Rural Okrug of Sarayevsky District
Dmitriyevka, Spassky District, Ryazan Oblast, a village in Ivankovsky Rural Okrug of Spassky District

Samara Oblast
As of 2010, four rural localities in Samara Oblast bear this name:
Dmitriyevka, Bezenchuksky District, Samara Oblast, a village in Bezenchuksky District
Dmitriyevka, Neftegorsky District, Samara Oblast, a selo in Neftegorsky District
Dmitriyevka, Pestravsky District, Samara Oblast, a selo in Pestravsky District
Dmitriyevka, Pokhvistnevsky District, Samara Oblast, a settlement in Pokhvistnevsky District

Saratov Oblast
As of 2010, seven rural localities in Saratov Oblast bear this name:
Dmitriyevka, Dukhovnitsky District, Saratov Oblast, a selo in Dukhovnitsky District
Dmitriyevka, Novouzensky District, Saratov Oblast, a selo in Novouzensky District
Dmitriyevka, Petrovsky District, Saratov Oblast, a village in Petrovsky District
Dmitriyevka (selo), Turkovsky District, Saratov Oblast, a selo in Turkovsky District
Dmitriyevka (village), Turkovsky District, Saratov Oblast, a village in Turkovsky District
Dmitriyevka, Volsky District, Saratov Oblast, a selo in Volsky District
Dmitriyevka, Yershovsky District, Saratov Oblast, a selo in Yershovsky District

Smolensk Oblast
As of 2010, one rural locality in Smolensk Oblast bears this name:
Dmitriyevka, Smolensk Oblast, a village in Shatalovskoye Rural Settlement of Pochinkovsky District

Tambov Oblast
As of 2010, ten inhabited localities in Tambov Oblast bear this name:

Urban localities
Dmitriyevka, Dmitriyevsky Settlement Council, Nikiforovsky District, Tambov Oblast, a work settlement under the administrative jurisdiction of  Dmitriyevsky Settlement Council of Nikiforovsky District

Rural localities
Dmitriyevka, Gavrilovsky District, Tambov Oblast, a selo in Dmitriyevsky Selsoviet of Gavrilovsky District
Dmitriyevka, Inzhavinsky District, Tambov Oblast, a village in Maryevsky Selsoviet of Inzhavinsky District
Dmitriyevka, Mordovsky District, Tambov Oblast, a village in Lavrovsky Selsoviet of Mordovsky District
Dmitriyevka, Morshansky District, Tambov Oblast, a selo in Dmitriyevsky Selsoviet of Morshansky District
Dmitriyevka, Golitsynsky Selsoviet, Nikiforovsky District, Tambov Oblast, a selo in Golitsynsky Selsoviet of Nikiforovsky District
Dmitriyevka, Sampursky District, Tambov Oblast, a village in Satinsky Selsoviet of Sampursky District
Dmitriyevka, Sosnovsky District, Tambov Oblast, a selo in Otyassky Selsoviet of Sosnovsky District
Dmitriyevka, Tambovsky District, Tambov Oblast, a village in Ivankovsky Selsoviet of Tambovsky District
Dmitriyevka, Uvarovsky District, Tambov Oblast, a village in Pavlodarsky Selsoviet of Uvarovsky District

Republic of Tatarstan
As of 2010, three rural localities in the Republic of Tatarstan bear this name:
Dmitriyevka, Nizhnekamsk, Republic of Tatarstan, a village under the administrative jurisdiction of the city of republic significance of Nizhnekamsk
Dmitriyevka, Aznakayevsky District, Republic of Tatarstan, a village in Aznakayevsky District
Dmitriyevka, Bavlinsky District, Republic of Tatarstan, a selo in Bavlinsky District

Tula Oblast
As of 2010, seven rural localities in Tula Oblast bear this name:
Dmitriyevka, Belyovsky District, Tula Oblast, a village in Bolotsky Rural Okrug of Belyovsky District
Dmitriyevka, Kamensky District, Tula Oblast, a village in Arkhangelsky Rural Okrug of Kamensky District
Dmitriyevka, Kireyevsky District, Tula Oblast, a village in Olensky Rural Okrug of Kireyevsky District
Dmitriyevka, Kurkinsky District, Tula Oblast, a village in Sergiyevskaya Volost of Kurkinsky District
Dmitriyevka, Suvorovsky District, Tula Oblast, a village in Zyabrevskaya Rural Territory of Suvorovsky District
Dmitriyevka, Lobanovsky Rural Okrug, Yefremovsky District, Tula Oblast, a village in Lobanovsky Rural Okrug of Yefremovsky District
Dmitriyevka, Tormasovsky Rural Okrug, Yefremovsky District, Tula Oblast, a village in Tormasovsky Rural Okrug of Yefremovsky District

Tyumen Oblast
As of 2010, one rural locality in Tyumen Oblast bears this name:
Dmitriyevka, Tyumen Oblast, a village in Sitnikovsky Rural Okrug of Omutinsky District

Udmurt Republic
As of 2010, one rural locality in the Udmurt Republic bears this name:
Dmitriyevka, Udmurt Republic, a village in Mukshinsky Selsoviet of Yakshur-Bodyinsky District

Ulyanovsk Oblast
As of 2010, two rural localities in Ulyanovsk Oblast bear this name:
Dmitriyevka, Inzensky District, Ulyanovsk Oblast, a village in Oskinsky Rural Okrug of Inzensky District
Dmitriyevka, Radishchevsky District, Ulyanovsk Oblast, a selo in Dmitriyevsky Rural Okrug of Radishchevsky District

Vladimir Oblast
As of 2010, one rural locality in Vladimir Oblast bears this name:
Dmitriyevka, Vladimir Oblast, a village in Muromsky District

Volgograd Oblast
As of 2010, two rural localities in Volgograd Oblast bear this name:
Dmitriyevka, Gorodishchensky District, Volgograd Oblast, a khutor in Karpovsky Selsoviet of Gorodishchensky District
Dmitriyevka, Olkhovsky District, Volgograd Oblast, a selo in Solodchinsky Selsoviet of Olkhovsky District

Voronezh Oblast
As of 2010, eight rural localities in Voronezh Oblast bear this name:
Dmitriyevka, Buturlinovsky District, Voronezh Oblast, a selo in Berezovskoye Rural Settlement of Buturlinovsky District
Dmitriyevka, Ertilsky District, Voronezh Oblast, a settlement in Pervoertilskoye Rural Settlement of Ertilsky District
Dmitriyevka, Gribanovsky District, Voronezh Oblast, a selo in Kalinovskoye Rural Settlement of Gribanovsky District
Dmitriyevka, Khokholsky District, Voronezh Oblast, a selo in Gremyachenskoye Rural Settlement of Khokholsky District
Dmitriyevka, Liskinsky District, Voronezh Oblast, a selo in Pochepskoye Rural Settlement of Liskinsky District
Dmitriyevka, Paninsky District, Voronezh Oblast, a selo in Dmitriyevskoye Rural Settlement of Paninsky District
Dmitriyevka, Semiluksky District, Voronezh Oblast, a village in Zemlyanskoye Rural Settlement of Semiluksky District
Dmitriyevka, Ternovsky District, Voronezh Oblast, a village in Yesipovskoye Rural Settlement of Ternovsky District

Yaroslavl Oblast
As of 2010, four rural localities in Yaroslavl Oblast bear this name:
Dmitriyevka, Lyubimsky District, Yaroslavl Oblast, a village in Kirillovsky Rural Okrug of Lyubimsky District
Dmitriyevka, Myshkinsky District, Yaroslavl Oblast, a village in Rozhdestvensky Rural Okrug of Myshkinsky District
Dmitriyevka, Pervomaysky District, Yaroslavl Oblast, a village in Semenovsky Rural Okrug of Pervomaysky District
Dmitriyevka, Rybinsky District, Yaroslavl Oblast, a village in Mikhaylovsky Rural Okrug of Rybinsky District

See also 
 Dmytrivka (disambiguation), the Ukrainian equivalent